Hurairah may refer to:
Abu Hurairah - one of the companions of Muhammad
Tell Abu Hureyra - an archaeological site in the Euphrates valley
Hurayra - a Syrian village